A list of films produced in Pakistan in 1953 (see 1953 in film):

1953

See also
1953 in Pakistan

External links
 Search Pakistani film - IMDB.com

1953
Pakistani
Films